This article lists the prime ministers of Cape Verde, an island country in the Atlantic Ocean off the coast of West Africa, since the establishment of the office of prime minister in 1975. Pedro Pires was the first person to hold the office, taking effect on 8 July 1975. The incumbent is Ulisses Correia e Silva, having taken office on 22 April 2016.

List of officeholders
Political parties

Notes

Timeline

See also

 Cape Verde
 List of presidents of Cape Verde
 List of colonial governors of Cape Verde
 Lists of office-holders
 List of current heads of state and government

References

External links
 Official Website
 World Statesmen – Cape Verde

Government of Cape Verde
 
Cape Verde
Prime Ministers